Edward J. Bebb (April 28, 1839 – July 12, 1916) was an American soldier who fought in the American Civil War. Bebb was awarded the country's highest award for bravery during combat, the Medal of Honor, for his action in Columbus, Georgia on April 16, 1865. He was honored with the award on June 17, 1865.

Biography
Bebb was born in Ohio to Edward (1800 - 1868) and Margaret Evans Bebb (1805 - 1868) on April 28, 1839. He moved to Iowa at age 12. Bebb enlisted into Company D of the 4th Iowa Cavalry on September 25, 1861 and was a private throughout his military career. On 16 April 1865 he formed part of a regiment, under the direction of General J. H. Wilson's, that were undertaking to capture the Chattahoochee River bridge to gain entry into the city. Bebb is reported to have captured a flag while the enemies were fleeing. He was awarded the Medal of Honor for his valor at this event.

Medal of Honor citation

Personal life
Bebb married Mary Adeline Hungerford (1845 - 1900) in Wapello, Iowa on March 8, 1866 having mustered out of the army soon after the conclusion of the Civil War.

See also

List of American Civil War Medal of Honor recipients: A–F

References

1839 births
1916 deaths
People of Iowa in the American Civil War
Union Army soldiers
United States Army Medal of Honor recipients
American Civil War recipients of the Medal of Honor